Zyle Daewoo Bus, formerly "Zyle Daewoo Commercial Vehicle" is a South Korean manufacturer of buses and is majority owned by Young-An Hat Company, based in Busan. It was established in 2002 as a successor to previous merger, Daewoo Motor Company. These buses are primarily used for public transportation.  Daewoo Bus has been in a partnership in 2006 with GM Daewoo (now GM Korea).

Operations

Current Production
Daewoo Bus' principal subsidiaries and partners are:

Zyle Daewoo Bus Corporation (Ulsan, South Korea)
Shanghai Wanxiang Daewoo Bus (Shanghai, China)
Guilin Daewoo (Guilin, China)
Daewoo Bus Costa Rica S.A. (San José, Costa Rica)
Daewoo Bus Vietnam (Vĩnh Phúc, Vietnam)
Daewoo Bus Kazakhstan (Semey, Kazakhstan)
Daewoo Pak Motors (Pvt.) Ltd. (Karachi, Pakistan)
Columbian Manufacturing Corporation (Santa Rosa, Laguna, Philippines)
Master Transportation Bus Manufacturing Ltd. (Taiwan)
Daewoo Bus Myanmar (Yangon, Myanmar)

Former Production
Daewoo Bus Busan Plant. (1960 - ?)

Current products

FX212 Super Cruiser
FX120 Cruising Star
FX116/115 Cruising Arrow (Some of FX116 are operating as line bus in South Korea with CNG engine)
BH120F Royal Cruiser II
BH116 Royal Luxury II

Big transportation bus
BX212M Royal Plus
BX212
BH120F Royal Cruiser
BH119 Royal Special
BH117H Royal Cruistar
BH116 Royal Luxury
BH115E Royal Economy
BH115H Royal Express

Smally medium-duty bus
BF106 (Front Engine/Diesel)
BH090 Royal Star

Line bus
BS120CN Royal Nonstep (NGV)
BS110CN Royal Nonstep (NGV/Diesel)
BV120MA
BC211M Royal Hi-city (NGV/Diesel)
Daewoo BS106 (With Low Floor Bus)/BF106 (NGV/Diesel)
Daewoo BS090
BC095 (2016-2017: Euro III/2018: Euro IV)

Columbian Manufacturing/Santarosa Motor Works
BV115
BS106
BH117
BS120S

Guilin Daewoo
GL6127HK
GL6128HK
GDW6117HK
GL6129HC
GL6128HW
GDW6120HG
GDW6900
GDW6900HGD
GDW6901HGD1

Former products
See also GM Daewoo

Shinjin Motor (1955~1971)
Shinjin Micro Bus (1962)
Shinjin Light Bus (1965)
Pioneer (1965)
FB100LK (1966)
B-FB-50 (1966)
DB102L (1968)
DHB400C (1970)
DAB (1970)
RC420TP (1971)

GM Korea Motor Company (1972~1976)
DB105LC (1972)
BD50DL (1973)
BLD24 (1973)
BD098 (1976)
BD101 (1976)
BU100/110 (1976)

Saehan Motor Company (1976~1983) 
BU120 (1976)
BL064 (1977)
BF101 (1977)
BR101 (1980)
BH120 (1981)
BV113 (1982)
BF105 (1982)

Daewoo Motor Company (1st, 1983~1994)
BV101 (1983)
BH120S (1983)
BH115Q (1984)
BH120H (1985)
BS105S (1985)
BS105 (1986)
BU113 (1986)
BH115H (1986)
BH115 (1986)
BF120 (1987)
BS106 (1990)
BH120F (1992)
BH113 (1994)

Daewoo Heavy Industry (1994~1999)
BH117H (1995)
BM090 (1996)
BH116 (1997)
BH115E (1998)

Daewoo Motor Company (2nd, 1999~2002)
BF106 (2001)
BH090 (2001)
BS090 (2002)
BV120MA (2002)
BS120CN (2002)

Daewoo Bus (2002~2013)
BH119 (2003)
BX212H/S (2004)
BC211M (2005)
DM 1724 urban bus
DM 1731 suburban bus
FX series (2007)
BC212MA (2007)

Columbian Manufacturing/Santarosa Motor Works
BF106 (2009)
BS106 NGV (2010)
BV115 (2009)
BH117H

Zyle Daewoo bus
BH119 (2003)
BX212H/S (2004)
BC211M (2005)
DM 1724 urban bus
DM 1731 suburban bus
FX series (2007)
BC212MA (2007)
LESTAR (2013)

Zyle Daewoo Commercial Vehicle
BX212M (2019)

References

External links

 

Bus manufacturers of South Korea
Manufacturing companies based in Busan
Vehicle manufacturing companies established in 2002
Daewoo
South Korean companies established in 2002
South Korean brands